Speech Interference Level (SIL) is an acoustical parameter calculated from sound pressure levels measured in octave bands. It is used to characterize a noise signal in the frequency range where the human ear has its highest sensitivity. 

The Speech Interference Level is calculated as the arithmetic mean of unweighted sound pressure levels in three or four octave bands in the 500 Hz - 4 kHz frequency range

Several variants of the Speech Interference Level are in use:

PSIL: Arithmetic mean of 500 Hz, 1 kHz and 2 kHz octave bands
SIL3: Arithmetic mean of 1 kHz, 2 kHz and 4 kHz octave bands
SIL4: Arithmetic mean of 500 Hz, 1 kHz, 2 kHz and 4 kHz octave bands

External links 
 Speech Interference Levels in Aircraft Interior Noise Measurement

Sound measurements